Białochowo  is a village in the administrative district of Gmina Rogóźno, within Grudziądz County, Kuyavian-Pomeranian Voivodeship, in north-central Poland.

The village has a population of 580.

History

Transport
The Polish National road 55 runs nearby, west of the village.

Notable residents
 Erich von Falkenhayn (1861–1922), German Chief of Staff of World War I
 Eugen von Falkenhayn (1853-1934), German General

References

Villages in Grudziądz County
Nazi war crimes in Poland